George Alexander Coulouris (1 October 1903 – 25 April 1989) was an English film and stage actor.

Early life
Coulouris was born in Manchester, Lancashire, England, the son of Abigail (née Redfern) and Nicholas Coulouris, a  merchant of Greek origin. He was brought up both in Manchester and nearby Urmston and was educated at Manchester Grammar School. He attended London's Central School of Speech and Drama, in the company of fellow students Laurence Olivier and Peggy Ashcroft.

Early career

Coulouris made his stage debut in 1926 with Henry V at the Old Vic. In 1928 and 1929 he appeared in several productions at the Cambridge Festival Theatre including Eugene O'Niell's The Hairy Ape.. By 1929, he made his first Broadway appearance, followed by his first Hollywood film role in 1933.

A major impact on his life was Orson Welles, whom he met in 1936 when they both had roles in the Broadway production of Sidney Kingsley's Ten Million Ghosts. Welles invited Coulouris to become a charter member of his Mercury Theatre, and in 1937 Coulouris performed the role of Mark Antony in the company's debut production, Caesar, an innovative modern-dress production of Shakespeare's Julius Caesar.

"Even 'Friends, Romans, countrymen' sounds on his tongue as if it were a rabble-rousing harangue he is uttering for the first time," noted John Mason Brown in the New York Post. 

In 1938, he appeared in the Mercury stage productions of The Shoemaker's Holiday and Heartbreak House, and became part of the repertory company that presented CBS Radio's The Mercury Theatre on the Air and its sponsored continuation, The Campbell Playhouse (1938–40).  Also for CBS, in 1944 he starred in the radio series Suspense, in the episode "Portrait without a Face".

In Citizen Kane (1941), Coulouris played Walter Parks Thatcher, a financier similar to J. P. Morgan. Coulouris and Welles each received a 1941 National Board of Review Award for their performances.

During the 1930s and 1940s, Coulouris remained a regular figure on the stage and screen, starring in his own Broadway production of Richard III in 1943. His films in this period included For Whom the Bell Tolls (1943), Between Two Worlds (1944), Mr. Skeffington (1944) and Watch on the Rhine (1943), in which he repeated the role he originated in the Broadway production. He also performed as Robert de Baudricourt in Joan of Arc (1948), starring Ingrid Bergman. While most of his performances are strong ones, usually as a heavy or villain, occasionally he could turn his serious characterizations into humorous ones. Thatcher in Citizen Kane is fussy and pompous at times. A better (if briefer) example was in Mr. Skeffington as Dr. Byles, planning to go on a well-deserved, long-delayed holiday only to find it delayed again by a selfish, impossible Fanny Skeffington (Bette Davis).

Coulouris was the first actor to star in the title role of the Bulldog Drummond programme on the Mutual Broadcasting System.

Return to Britain
Coulouris returned to Britain after 1950, living first in Putney and later in Hampstead. He appeared in more films, theatre and television productions. His stage work was the most well regarded and included the title role in King Lear at the Glasgow Citizens' Theatre (1952); the lead (Dr. Stockmann) in An Enemy of the People (1959) at the Arts Theatre, Cambridge; Peter Flynn in Seán O'Casey's The Plough and the Stars at the Mermaid Theatre (1962); a part in August Strindberg's The Dance of Death; and  Big Daddy in Tennessee Williams's Cat on a Hot Tin Roof (1970).

Later film roles included parts in The Heart of the Matter (1953), Doctor in the House (1954), Papillon (1973), Mahler and Murder on the Orient Express (both 1974). He had rare leading roles in the British horror movies The Man Without a Body (1957) and The Woman Eater (1958).

He played in over 80 films, but radio roles were also numerous, and his television roles included parts in Hancock's Half Hour ("The Missing Page"), Danger Man and The Prisoner ("Checkmate", 1967). Other appearances included the recurring role of science writer Harcourt Brown in the ABC serials, Pathfinders to Mars and Pathfinders to Venus, which were sequels to earlier serials; Target Luna and Pathfinders in Space. He appeared as Arbitan in the Doctor Who serial The Keys of Marinus (1964).

Personal life
Coulouris was married to Louise Franklin from 1930 until her death in 1976, and then to Elizabeth Donaldson from 1977 until his death in 1989. He was the father of computer scientist George Coulouris and artist Mary Louise Coulouris.

Death and legacy
Coulouris died in London on 25 April 1989, of heart failure following Parkinson's disease.

In Me and Orson Welles (2008), Richard Linklater's period drama set in the days surrounding the premiere of the Mercury Theatre's production of Caesar, Coulouris is portrayed by Ben Chaplin.

Broadway roles
George Coulouris's Broadway credits are listed at the Internet Broadway Database.

Actor
 The Novice and the Duke (9 December 1929 – January 1930) as Friar Peter
The Late Christopher Bean (31 October 1932 – May 1933) as Tallant
Best Sellers (3 May – June 1933) as Julian Mosca
 Mary of Scotland (27 November 1933 – July 1934) as Lord Burghley and as Lord Erskine
Valley Forge (10 December 1934 – January 1935) as Lieutenant Cutting
Blind Alley (24 September 1935 – January 1936) as Dr. Anthony Shelby
Saint Joan (9 March – May 1936) as John de Stogumber
Ten Million Ghosts (23 October – November 1936) as Zacharey
Caesar (11 November 1937 – March 1938) as Marc Antony
The Shoemaker's Holiday (1 January – 28 April 1938) as The King
Heartbreak House (29 April – 11 June 1938) as Boss Mangan
Madame Capet (October 1938) as Mirabeau
The White Steed (10 January 1939 –?) as Father Shaughnessy
Cue for Passion (19–28 December 1940) as John Elliott
Watch on the Rhine (1 April 1941 – 21 February 1942) as Teck de Brancovis
King Richard III (24 March – 3 April 1943) as Richard, Duke of Glouchester (Richard III)
The Master Race (1944) American drama as Von Beck
The Alchemist (6–16 May 1948) as Subtle
S.S. Glencairn (20–30 May 1948) as The Donkey Man
The Insect Comedy (3–12 June 1948) as The Vagrant
Beekman Place (7–31 October 1964) as Samuel Holt
The Condemned of Altona (3 February – 13 March 1966)

Director
King Richard III (24 March – 3 April 1943)

Filmography

Christopher Bean (1933) as Tallent
All This, and Heaven Too (1940) as Charpentier
The Lady in Question (1940) as Defense Attorney
Citizen Kane (1941) as Walter Parks Thatcher
Assignment in Brittany (1943) as Captain Hans Holz
This Land Is Mine (1943) as Prosecutor
For Whom the Bell Tolls (1943) as André Massart (uncredited)
Watch on the Rhine (1943) as Teck de Brancovis
Between Two Worlds (1944) as Mr. Lingley
Mr. Skeffington (1944) as Doctor Byles
The Master Race (1944) as Von Beck
None But the Lonely Heart (1944) as Jim Mordinoy
A Song to Remember (1945) as Louis Pleyel
Hotel Berlin (1945) as Joachim Helm
Lady on a Train (1945) as Mr. Saunders
Confidential Agent (1945) as Captain Currie
Nobody Lives Forever (1946) as Doc Ganson
The Verdict (1946) as Supt. John R. Buckley
California (1947) as Capt. Pharaoh Coffin
 Mr. District Attorney (1947) as James Randolph
Where There's Life (1947) as Prime Minister Krivoc
Sleep, My Love (1948) as Charles Vernay
Beyond Glory (1948) as Lew Proctor
A Southern Yankee (1948) as Maj. Jack Drumman aka The Grey Spider
Joan of Arc (1948) as Sir Robert de Baudricourt - governor of Vaucouleurs
Appointment with Venus (1951) as Capt. Weiss
Outcast of the Islands (1951) as Chief of Police Spadoni
Venetian Bird (1952) as Babalatchi
The Dog and the Diamonds (1953) as Forbes
The Heart of the Matter (1953) as Portuguese Captain
A Day to Remember (1953) as Foreign Legion Captain.
The Runaway Bus (1954) as Edward Schroeder
Doctor in the House (1954) as Briggs
Duel in the Jungle (1954) as Capt. Malburn
The Teckman Mystery (1954) as Garvin
Mask of Dust (1954) as 'Pic' Dallapiccola
Doctor at Sea (1955) as 'Chippie' the Carpenter
Private's Progress (1956) as Padre 
The Big Money (1956) as The Colonel
Doctor at Large (1957) as Pascoe
Tarzan and the Lost Safari (1957) as Carl Kraski
The Man Without a Body (1957) as Karl Brussard
Kill Me Tomorrow (1957) as Heinz Webber
Seven Thunders (1957) as Paul Bourdin
I Accuse! (1958) as Colonel Sandherr
The Woman Eater (1958) as Doctor Moran
No Time to Die (1958) as Camp Commandant
Law and Disorder (1958) as 'Bennie' Bensuson
Spy in the Sky! (1958) as Col. Benedict
The Son of Robin Hood (1958) as Alan A Dale 
Bluebeard's Ten Honeymoons (1960) as Lacoste
Conspiracy of Hearts (1960) as Petrelli
The Boy Who Stole a Million (1960) as Bank manager
Surprise Package (1960) as Dr. Hugo Panzer
Fury at Smugglers' Bay (1961) as François Lejeune
King of Kings (1961) as Camel Driver
Come Fly with Me (1963) as Vienna Police Inspector (uncredited)
In the Cool of the Day (1963) (scenes deleted)
The Crooked Road (1965) as Carlo
The Skull (1965) as Dr. Londe
Scruggs (1965)
Arabesque (1966) as Ragheeb
Too Many Thieves (1967) as Andrew
The Other People (1968) as Police Inspector (lost film rediscovered in Paramount Archive in 2017)
The Assassination Bureau (1969) as Swiss Peasant
Land Raiders (1970) as Cardenas
No Blade of Grass (1970) as Mr. Sturdevant
Blood from the Mummy's Tomb (1971) as Professor Berrigan
A Clockwork Orange (1971) as Professor (uncredited)
Tower of Evil (1972) as John Gurney
The Stranger (1973) as the Bookseller
The Final Programme (1973) as Dr. Powys
Papillon (1973) as Dr. Chatal
Mahler (1974) as Doctor Roth
Percy's Progress (1974) as Prof. Godowski
Murder on the Orient Express (1974) as Doctor Constantine
The Antichrist (1974) as Father Mittner
Shout at the Devil (1976) as El Keb
The Ritz (1976) as Old Man Vespucci

References

External links

 
 George Coulouris at Turner Classic Movies 
 
 The George Coulouris Archive, material related to the actor, compiled by George Coulouris, jr.
 Literature on George Coulouris

1903 births
1989 deaths
Alumni of the Royal Central School of Speech and Drama
English people of Greek descent
British people of Greek descent
Deaths from Parkinson's disease
Neurological disease deaths in England
English male film actors
English male stage actors
People educated at Manchester Grammar School
Male actors from Salford
Male actors from Manchester
20th-century English male actors
British expatriate male actors in the United States